Paretroplus tsimoly is a species of cichlid fish from the Betsiboka River basin in northwestern Madagascar. Like other members of the lamena group, it is a rheophile (although less so than Oxylapia polli).

References

Tsimoly
Freshwater fish of Madagascar
Fish described in 2001
Taxonomy articles created by Polbot
Taxa named by Prosanta Chakrabarty